Mezzastris (Mezastris, Mezzastri) was the family name of two Umbrian painters who worked in the Foligno area.

 Pier Antonio Mezzastris (or Pierantonio) was the more famous, and the one usually meant when no first name is indicated
 Bernardino Mezzastris (or Belardino), possibly the son of the preceding, was a lesser known painter

Surnames